Wives and Daughters is a 1999 four-part BBC serial adapted from the 1864 novel Wives and Daughters: An Everyday Story by Victorian author Elizabeth Gaskell.

The series was a joint production of the BBC and WGBH Boston, an American public broadcast station and 'won high audience ratings' when it first screened in the UK in 1999. Its audience rivalry with an adaptation of Charles Dickens' Oliver Twist, screened on ITV at the same time, was dubbed 'the battle of the bonnets'. It appeared in the USA on BBC America in August 2000 and was later shown on PBS.

It focuses on Molly Gibson (Justine Waddell), the daughter of the town doctor, and the changes that occur in her life after her widowed father chooses to remarry. The union brings into her once-quiet life an ever-proper stepmother (Francesca Annis) who is 'too vain and shallow to care for anything beyond her improved social status'. Also a flirtatious stepsister, Cynthia (Keeley Hawes), while a friendship with the local squire brings about an unexpected romance. A New York Times review of the series in 2001 said 'The entire cast gets the characters right.'

Written by Andrew Davies, produced by Sue Birtwistle and directed by Nicholas Renton, the programme also features Michael Gambon, Penelope Wilton, Bill Paterson and Rosamund Pike.

Production

Davies and Birtwistle collaborated on the BBC's television popular adaptation of Jane Austen's Pride and Prejudice in 1995. Following that success the BBC 'effectively told the duo they could adapt any book they wished', leading to Wives and Daughters. Birtwhistle described Gaskell's novel as 'strong, direct and passionate' and this offered 'the necessary elements for a popular classic TV drama'.

Filming was based at Elstree Studios with additional scenes shot at historic properties across England. Great Chalfield Manor, Wiltshire was used for exterior scenes for the Hamley family home, while interior scenes were filmed at Levens Hall in Kendal, Cumbria. Wentworth Woodhouse, South Yorkshire was used for Cumnor Towers, the grand family home Molly visits as a child when she first encounters her future step-mother. Additional outdoor scenes were shot at Dyrham Park in South Gloucestershire; the National Trust property was closed to the public for three days while these scenes were shot.

Cast

Reception
At the 2000 British Academy Television Awards, the series was nominated for seven awards and won four including Best Actor (Television) for Michael Gambon as Squire Hamley. Gambon's performance was described as: 'Gruff on the outside, with a huge sentimental streak, the country squire is a familiar type, but he makes him seem endearing and fresh.'

References

External links
 
 

1990s British drama television series
1999 British television series debuts
1999 British television series endings
BBC television dramas
Television shows shot at Elstree Film Studios
Television shows written by Andrew Davies
1990s British television miniseries
Television shows based on British novels
Television series by WGBH
Television series set in the 1830s
Television shows set in Cumbria
English-language television shows

es:Esposas e hijas